Cerro Las Minas is the highest mountain in Honduras. Cerro Las Minas is located in the rugged and relatively isolated Lempira Department in the western part of the country.

It is part of the Cordillera de Celaque mountain range and is given the name "Pico Celaque, 2849m" on local 1:50,000 topographic mapping, but SRTM data suggests that 2870 m is more accurate.

References

External links

Las Minas
Highest points of countries